Zuzana is a common female given name in the Czech Republic and Slovakia. It is often translated to other languages as Zuzanna (Polish), Zsuzsanna (Hungarian), Suzanne, Susan, or Susannah – all commonly derived from the Hebrew language name Shoshana, meaning "lilly".

The nameday for people with this name is 11 August.

Pronunciation 
Both Czech and Slovak have initial stress and mark vowel length with acute accents, so the correct pronunciation of the name in the two languages is with the stress on the first syllable and with short vowels /'zuzana/.

Variants of the name (nicknames) 
There are several variations of the name. For example, the name is often shortened to Zuzka. For a child with the name Zuzana, one can also use the diminutive form Zuzanka. A modern nickname would be Zuzi.

People with this first name 
 Zuzana Brzobohatá (born 1962), Czech politician
 Zuzana Chalupová (1925–2001), Serbian naïve painter
 Zuzana Čaputová (born 1973), first woman president of Slovakia, lawyer, activist, politician 
 Zuzana Drdáková (born 1987), Slovak ice hockey player
 Zuzana Kečkéšová (born 1980), Slovak molecular biologist 
 Zuzana Licko (born 1961), Slovak-born American type designer, co-founder of Emigre
 Zuzana Navarová (1959–2004), Czech singer
 Zuzana Rehák-Štefečeková (born 1984), Slovak sports shooter
 Zuzana Roithová (born 1953), Czech politician
 Zuzana Růžičková (1927–2017), Czech harpsichordist
 Zuzana Tomas (born 1977), Slovak marathon runner
 Zuzana Zvolenská (born 1972), Slovak Minister of Health

See also 
 Susanne (disambiguation)

Czech feminine given names
Slovak feminine given names